This is a list of Singing Battle episodes.
 – Contestant is instantly eliminated by 13 judges (received less than or equal to 6 votes)
 – Contestant advances to the next round
Contestant in italic hasn't performed in their round and was replaced by their team's hidden card
Contestant who has * right next their name is a hidden card
Contestant who has ** right next their name is an early loser and they has to perform for the revival

Pilot
Team Yoon Jong-shin: Hwang Seok-jeong, Son Ho-young (g.o.d), 
Team Jung Jae-hyung: , Choi Yoon-young, Lee Joo-seung
Uhm Hyun-kyung appeared in Jaehyung team but she hasn't performed.
Team Kim Hyung-seok: Sunwoo Jae-duk, Im Hyung-joon, Kwon Hyuk-soo
Team Lee Sang-min: Moon Se-yoon, Lee Yong-jin,

1st Game (Episodes 1–2)
Team Lee Sang-min: Hwang Seok-jeong, Im Hyung-joon, Song Jae-hee
Team Kim Su-ro: , Won Ki-joon, 
Team Yang Dong-geun: Park Kyung-lim, Park Seung-geon (박승건), 

2nd Game (Episodes 2–3)
Team Kim Hyung-seok: Kim Ji-min, Yang Se-chan, 
Team Lee Sang-min: Won Ki-joon, Im Hyung-joon, 
Team Jo Gyu-chan: Park Jun-gyu, 
Team Kangta: Park Na-rae, Lee Yong-jin,

3rd Game (Episodes 4–5)
Team Kim Gwang-jin: Choo Sung-hoon, Shin Soo-ji, Jeong Da-rae
Team Jo Gyu-chan: Park Na-rae, Lee Yong-jin, 
Team Park Soo-hong: Seo Yu-ri, Jo Se-ho

4th Game (Episodes 6–7)
Team Kim Hyung-seok: Kim Min-hee, Yoon Hae-young, Jang Ki-yong
Team Jo Gyu-chan: Kim Joon-ho, 
Team Lee Sang-min: Lee Yong-jin, 
Team Park Soo-hong: Kwon Hyuk-soo, Lee Se-young

5th Game (Episodes 8–9)
Team Kim Hyung-seok: Seomoon Tak, Sojung (Ladies' Code), U Sung-eun
Team Yoon Il-sang: Tei, Heo Young-saeng (SS501/Double S 301), Raina (After School/Orange Caramel)
Team Jo Gyu-chan: Bae Ki-sung (CAN), Lee Ji-hye,  (Flower)
Team Lee Sang-min: Lee Jin-sung, Mamamoo (Solar, Wheein)

6th Game (Episodes 10–11)
Team Park Wan-kyu: , Jang Do-yeon, Kim Ji-min
Team Muzie: , Oh Seung-yoon, Seo Shin-ae

7th Game (Episodes 12–13)
Team Park Soo-hong: NRG (Chun Myung-hoon), 
Team Kim Su-ro: , Kang Ji-sub, Ji Joo-yeon
Team Tony An: Kim Ga-yeon, Joo Woo-jae, Sumin (Awe5omeBaby)

8th Game (Episodes 14–15)
Team Kim Su-ro (Actors' team): Kang Sung-jin, Kim San-ho, Lee Soo-min
Team Kim Jong-min (Singers' team): Chun Myung-hoon, Im Hyung-joon, Lee Ji-hye
Team Muzie (Global team): Sayuri Fujita, Daniel Lindemann, Greg Priester

9th Game (Episodes 16–17)
Team Kim Su-ro: Kim Ho-young (김호영), Min Woo-hyuk
Team Muzie: , Jo Kwon (2AM), Leo (VIXX)

10th Game (Episodes 18–19)
Team Park Soo-hong: Park Kyung-lim, 
Team Kim Su-ro: , Kim Ho-young (김호영), Kang Dong-ho
Team Muzie: Hwang Seung-eon, Jang Ki-yong

11th Game (Episodes 20–21)
Team Kim Su-ro: Woo Ji-won, Ha Tae-kwon, Choi Byung-chul
Team Lee Sang-min: Hwang Seok-jeong, Ahn Se-ha
Special appearance by Ryoo Sang-wook's girlfriend, actress Kim Hye-jin

12th Game (Episodes 22–23)
Actor Teams
Team Park Soo-hong: Moon Hee-kyung, Kim Hye-seong
Comedian Teams

13th Game (Episodes 24–25)
Team Park Soo-hong: Stephanie, Park Ji-woo, 
Team Lee Sang-min: Kim Young-ho, 

14th Game (Episodes 26–27)
Team Park Soo-hong (Actors): Ryu Tae-joon, Park Min-ji, Heo Young-ji
Team Lee Sang-min (Rappers): Sleepy (Untouchable), Jeon Ji-yoon, Eli Kim
Team Park Kyung-lim (Entertainers): , Boom, Seo Yu-ri

15th Game (Episodes 28–29)
Team Park Kyung-lim: Seo Young-joo (서영주), 
Team Muzie: Stephanie, Son Dong-woon (HIGHLIGHT), Kim Shin-eui (Monni)

Notes

References

Lists of reality television series episodes
Lists of variety television series episodes
Lists of South Korean television series episodes